Jiang Yibing (born February 17, 1970) is a Chinese figure skater. She represented China at the 1988 Winter Olympics, where she placed 25th. She also competed at the 1985 World Figure Skating Championships, where she placed 23rd. Following her retirement from competitive skating, she served as an international and ISU Judge, and as an ISU Technical Specialist for China.

After coaching for many years in China, she moved to Canada and began coaching there in March 2007 under the name Jennifer Jiang. She began coaching Mira Leung in 2008. Jiang started coaching at Sunset Skating Club in Vancouver, BC, Canada in 2008, and became the Skating Director at the club since 2014.

Results

References

 Sports-Reference profile

Chinese female single skaters
Figure skating judges
Olympic figure skaters of China
Figure skaters at the 1988 Winter Olympics
1970 births
Living people
International Skating Union technical specialists